Der Richter von Zalamea is an East German film. It was released in 1956.

Cast

External links
 

1956 films
East German films
Films based on works by Pedro Calderón de la Barca
1950s German-language films
1950s German films
German drama films
1956 drama films
German black-and-white films